Caimito is a corregimiento in Capira District, Panamá Oeste Province, Panama with a population of 1,635 as of 2010. Its population as of 1990 was 1,319; its population as of 2000 was 1,438.

References

Corregimientos of Panamá Oeste Province